Hirebandadi  is a village in the southern state of Karnataka, India. It is located in the Puttur taluk of Dakshina Kannada district.

Demographics
 India census, Hirebandadi had a population of 5165 with 2537 males and 2628 females.

See also
 Dakshina Kannada
 Districts of Karnataka

References

External links
 http://Dakshina Kannada.nic.in/

Villages in Dakshina Kannada district